Manuel Torres (born 17 March 1957) is a Colombian equestrian. He competed at five Olympic Games. As of August 2022, Torres was on Temporary Restriction by the United States Center for SafeSport, following allegations of misconduct, and subject to: “coaching/ training restriction(s); no unsupervised coaching/training; and no contact directive(s).”

References

1957 births
Living people
Colombian male equestrians
Olympic equestrians of Colombia
Equestrians at the 1988 Summer Olympics
Equestrians at the 1992 Summer Olympics
Equestrians at the 1996 Summer Olympics
Equestrians at the 2000 Summer Olympics
Equestrians at the 2008 Summer Olympics
Sportspeople from Cartagena, Colombia
20th-century Colombian people
21st-century Colombian people